State Road 135 (SR 135) in the U.S. State of Indiana is a road that connects Indianapolis with the Ohio River; for the most part it is a two-lane road except for near Greenwood and Indianapolis.

Route description
The southern terminus is the Matthew E. Welsh Bridge on the east side of Mauckport. The bridge connects to Kentucky Route 79 in Brandenburg, Kentucky on the south side of the river.

The road runs north along rolling terrain in Harrison and Washington counties. It continues north through hilly country, passing Starve Hollow Lake State Recreation Area in Jackson County and the Brown County State Park. It then passes into the flatter terrain of Johnson and Marion counties.

History
State Road 135 was known as State Road 35 until U.S. Route 35 was commissioned in Indiana in February 1935.

State Road 135 previously terminated a few miles farther north in the city, but was shifted down to its current northernmost location of Thompson Road when U.S. Highways and Indiana State Roads were all truncated at or rerouted around major cities onto available bypasses in the early 1990s. It followed Meridian St., Troy Ave., and ended at US 31 and SR 37 at the time (now Madison Ave.).

Major intersections

References

External links

135
Transportation in Indianapolis
Transportation in Brown County, Indiana
Transportation in Harrison County, Indiana
Transportation in Jackson County, Indiana
Transportation in Johnson County, Indiana
Transportation in Marion County, Indiana
Transportation in Washington County, Indiana